Justice for All is a Hong Kong television game show produced by Television Broadcasts Limited. The show is hosted by Carol Cheng; however, it also invites 3 guests and 2 lawyers to explain the answers. The first season was aired from April 25 to May 29, 2005. The second season was aired from September 19 to October 28, 2005. The third season was aired from May 20 to July 1, 2006.

Gameplay
In every episode, there are 100 participants. The show will provide 2 law documents on video, and will then ask a question that is related to the video. The participants will then have to choose either one of the answers, and so are the invited guests. After that the participants will have a chance to correct their answers. One of the lawyers will then explain the answers.

Hong Kong legal television series
TVB original programming
2000s game shows
2000s legal television series
Hong Kong game shows